Irina Vlah (born 26 February 1974) is a Moldovan politician. She served as member of the Parliament of the Republic of Moldova from 2005 to 2009 and from 2014 to 2015. Since 15 April 2015 she has been the Governor (Başkan) of the Autonomous Territorial Unit of Gagauzia (Gagauz Yeri). 

According to the polls made in 2019 related to the most popular politicians in Moldova, Irina Vlah is on the 9th position among the top of politicians in which Moldovans have the highest trust.

Honours and accolades

Foreign honours
: Friend of Azerbaijan Golden Order in 2019.

References

External links
Personal website
Profile on parliament's website

1974 births
Gagauz people
People from Gagauzia
People from Comrat
Living people
Moldovan MPs 2005–2009
Moldovan female MPs
21st-century Moldovan women politicians